Golden Boy is the debut album by Sin With Sebastian, a moniker used by the German musician/songwriter Sebastian Roth. The Eurodance album contained the international hits "Shut Up (and Sleep with Me)", "He Belongs to Me" and the title track "Golden Boy"

Track listing
 "Shut Up (and Sleep with Me)" (Airplay Mix) 3:43
 "Put It On" 3:28 additional Vocals by Carmelina
 "Golden Boy" (Airplay Mix) 3:47
 "He Belongs to Me" 3:41  additional Vocals Marianne Rosenberg, [Female Choir] – Annette Humpe, Inga Humpe, Luci van Org
 "Jungle of Love" 4:24 additional Vocals by Carmelina
 "Birthday Baby" (Tokio Version) 3:13  additional Vocals by Carmelina
 "Don't Go Away" 3:44  additional Vocals by Jevon
 "When Things Go Wrong" 4:47 additional Vocals by Axel Christallo
 "I'll Wait for You" (Live) 4:44 additional Vocals by Steve
 "Right or Wrong" 3:48 Cello by Lucia Woydak and Piano by Chris-Fun-Deylen
 "The Journey Ends" (Reprise) 6:01
 "Shut Up (and Sleep with Me)" (George Morel Remix (Encore)) 7:17 Remix, Producer George Morel

References

1995 debut albums
Sin With Sebastian albums